Hans-Heinrich "Heiner" Pahl (born 27 February 1960) is a retired German footballer and current manager. He spent four seasons with Eintracht Braunschweig in the Bundesliga, as well as three seasons in the 2. Bundesliga.

References

External links

1960 births
Living people
People from Gifhorn
German footballers
Eintracht Braunschweig players
VfL Wolfsburg players
Association football defenders
Bundesliga players
2. Bundesliga players
Footballers from Lower Saxony